Sandra Louise Anderson (née Smith; May 28, 1944 – November 3, 2018), professionally known as Sondra Locke, was an American actress and director. She achieved recognition for her relationship with Clint Eastwood and the six hit films they made together.

An alumna of Middle Tennessee State University, Locke broke into regional show business with assorted posts at the Nashville-based radio station WSM-AM, then segued into television as a promotions assistant for WSM-TV. In 1968, she made her film debut in The Heart Is a Lonely Hunter, for which she was nominated for an Academy Award for Best Supporting Actress. Locke went on to appear in such box office successes as Willard (1971), The Outlaw Josey Wales (1976), The Gauntlet (1977), Every Which Way but Loose (1978), Bronco Billy (1980), Any Which Way You Can (1980) and Sudden Impact (1983). She worked regularly with Eastwood, who was her companion for 14 years despite their marriages to other people. She also directed four films, notably Impulse (1990), and published an autobiography, The Good, the Bad, and the Very Ugly: A Hollywood Journey (1997).

Locke's persona belied her age, and she habitually played roles written for women much younger than herself. She claimed to have been born several years later than 1944, and her true age remained a secret throughout her career. For reasons never made clear, her death was not publicly announced, and was only confirmed by vital statistics six weeks after she died of cardiac arrest at the age of 74.

Background, early life and education

Sandra Louise Smith was born on May 28, 1944, the daughter of New York City native Raymond Smith, then a soldier stationed at Camp Forrest, and Pauline Bayne, a pencil factory worker from Huntsville, Alabama, who was of mostly Scottish descent, with matrilineages in South Carolina extending back to the late 18th century. Locke's parents separated before her birth. In her autobiography, Locke noted that "although Momma would not admit it, I knew Mr. Smith never married my mother." She had a maternal half-brother, Donald (born April 26, 1946) from Bayne's subsequent brief marriage to William B. Elkins. When Bayne married Alfred Locke in 1948, Sandra and Donald assumed his surname. She grew up in Shelbyville, Tennessee, where her stepfather owned a construction company; the family later moved to nearby Wartrace. Self-described as introspective and ambitious, Locke started working part-time at age 16, drove her own car, and had a phone installed in her bedroom.

Locke was a cheerleader and class valedictorian in junior high. From 1958, she attended Shelbyville Central High School, where she was again valedictorian and voted "Duchess of Studiousness" by classmates. She also played on the girls' basketball team, served as PTSA representative and was president of the French club. Despite this, she wasn't considered "date material" by the more socially prominent boys in her class. Following graduation in 1962, Locke enrolled at Middle Tennessee State University (then Middle Tennessee State College) in Murfreesboro on a full scholarship. Majoring in drama, she was a member of the Alpha Psi Omega honor society while at MTSU and appeared on stage in Life with Father and The Crucible. She dropped out after completing two semesters of study.

In or around 1963, Locke essentially broke off contact with her family, concluding: "It made no sense for any of us to spend our lives pretending to have relationships that did not really exist." She never knew her biological father, and did not attend the funerals of her mother (deceased 1997) or stepfather (deceased 2007), nor did she have anything to do with her brother, sister-in-law and three nieces. Donald blamed Gordon Anderson – Locke's best friend since adolescence and future husband – for the rift, claiming Anderson had "an almost hypnotic spell on her."

Locke held a variety of jobs, including as a bookkeeper for Tyson Foods and secretary in a real-estate office. For a time she lived in the commuter town of Gallatin. In 1964, she joined the staff at radio station WSM-AM 650 in Nashville and was promoted to its television affiliate WSM-Channel 4 the following year. Locke's biggest coup while employed there was hosting actor Robert Loggia when Loggia visited Nashville to promote his TV pilot T.H.E. Cat, during which he "flirted outrageously" with Locke. She also modeled for The Tennessean fashion page, acted in commercials for Rich-Schwartz ladies apparel and Southerland Gel mattresses, among others, and gained further stage experience in productions for Circle Players Inc. In 1966, the 22-year-old appeared in a UPI wire photo that showed her cavorting in new fallen snow. Within one year of this exposure, she decided to pursue a career in film and changed the spelling of her first name to avoid being called Sandy.

Career

Rise to prominence

In July 1967, Locke competed with 590 other Southern actresses and dozens of New York hopefuls for the part of Mick Kelly in a big-screen adaptation of Carson McCullers' novel The Heart Is a Lonely Hunter opposite Alan Arkin. For the first audition in Birmingham, then-fiancé Gordon Anderson gave his bride a so-called Hollywood makeover: he bound her bosom, bleached her eyebrows and carefully fixed her hair, makeup and outfit so as to create a more gamine appearance. They also lied about her age, shaving off six years to make her seem younger – a pretense Locke would keep up for the rest of her career. After callbacks in New Orleans and Manhattan, she was cast in the role by recommendation from Marion Dougherty.

The film came out in the summer of 1968 to critical acclaim. Locke's performance garnered her an Academy Award nomination, as well as a pair of Golden Globe nominations for Best Supporting Actress and Most Promising Newcomer – Female. Being the oldest nominee in the latter category, she concealed that distinction through retconning with aid from studio publicists. She won "Most Promising New Star of the Year" at the Show-A-Rama film exhibitor convention. Although her salary for the film was reported in newspapers as $15,000, Locke later claimed it was less than one-third that amount.

Commercial ups and downs, missed roles, TV work

Hoping to shed the plain  image she accentuated in her screen debut, in January 1969 Locke posed for a semi-nude pictorial by photographer Frank Bez, which was published in the December issue of Playboy. The Playboy layout established Locke's status as a sex symbol, and the images were recycled in other men's magazines as her fame increased. Nearly three decades later, Locke said she still got those photos in fan mail requesting her autograph.

Her next role was as Melisse in Cover Me Babe (1970), originally titled Run Shadow Run, opposite Robert Forster. She made it as part of a $150,000 three-picture deal with 20th Century Fox, and was compensated for the other two which never came to fruition. It was announced that she would play the lead in Lovemakers – a film adaptation of Robert Nathan's novel The Color of Evening – but no movie resulted. Locke was offered Barbara Hershey's role in Last Summer (1969), but her management turned it down without telling her. Shortly afterwards she passed on the lead in My Sweet Charlie (1970), which won an Emmy for its eventual star Patty Duke.

In 1971, Locke co-starred with Bruce Davison and Ernest Borgnine in the psychological thriller Willard, which became a surprise box office smash. Locke felt overqualified for her role but did it as a favor to Davison, who at the time was her unofficial paramour. She was then featured in William A. Fraker's underseen mystery A Reflection of Fear (1972), which required her to project the image of a character nearly half her age, and held the title role in The Second Coming of Suzanne (1974), winner of three gold medals at the Atlanta Film Festival. Both films were shelved for two years before finally opening in arthouse cinemas, attracting little attention at first. Over time Suzanne has developed a cult following, while Reflection is cited as an early example of media portrayals of transgender people.

In 1973, Locke was attached to star in Terminal Circle. "It's a woman's role that comes along once in a lifetime," she said. The San Francisco-set drama was to be directed by Mal Karman and shot by cinematographer Robert Primes, who did camerawork for Gimme Shelter, but it was scrapped for lack of funds. She was up for a big part in Earthquake (1974), but lost out to Geneviève Bujold.

Locke guested on top-rated television drama series throughout the first half of the 1970s, including The F.B.I., Cannon (as two different characters), Barnaby Jones and Kung Fu. She was advised by her agents to stay away from TV, but thought it foolish to sit around not working between films. In the 1972 Night Gallery episode "A Feast of Blood", she played the victim of a curse planted by Norman Lloyd; the recipient of a brooch that devoured her. Lloyd acted with Locke again in Gondola (1973), a racially themed, three-character teleplay co-starring Bo Hopkins, and commended the actress for "a beautiful performance – perhaps her best ever." Ron Harper, who worked with Locke on the short-lived 1974 show Planet of the Apes, was even more effusive: "After acting with her in a couple of scenes, there was something so feminine about her that I could picture myself easily falling for her ... She's one of those women who exudes femininity, and you just become so attracted to that."

Films with Clint Eastwood

In 1975, Locke was cast in the western film The Outlaw Josey Wales as the love interest of Clint Eastwood's eponymous character. Locke said she chose the role for its exposure, following a run of unremarkable credits. She took a pay cut just to be in the film; her salary for Josey Wales was $18,000, less than half of what she'd earned for her previous job. The film was one of the top 15 grossing films of 1976 and revived Locke's career. She followed it up with a lead role alongside Eastwood in the popular action film The Gauntlet (1977), the duo replacing Steve McQueen and Barbra Streisand, who bowed out from the production owing to a reported clash of egos. Its pre-publicity touted Locke as "the first actress ever to be in a Clint Eastwood movie and get equal billing on screen with the macho star." Eastwood predicted that she would win an Oscar for her performance. Locke wasn't even nominated and received mixed critical response at best: on the upside, Vincent Canby of The New York Times said "Locke is not only pretty, but also occasionally genuinely funny" and Los Angeles Times critic Kevin Thomas stated that Locke "has not received such a rich opportunity since her Academy Award-nominated debut"; in contrast, Gene Siskel of the Chicago Tribune said "she's wasted here" and TV Guide felt that "Locke is simply repulsive."

Over the course of their decade-and-a-half-long personal relationship, Locke did not work in any capacity on any theatrical motion picture other than with Eastwood except for 1977's experimental horror western The Shadow of Chikara. The home invasion film Death Game (1977), though released after they became an item, was actually shot in 1974. "Clint wanted me to work only with him," said Locke. "He didn't like the idea of me being away from him."

In 1978, Locke and Eastwood appeared with an orangutan named Clyde in that year's fourth highest-grossing film, Every Which Way but Loose. She portrayed country singer Lynn Halsey-Taylor in the adventure-comedy. Its 1980 sequel Any Which Way You Can – for which Locke earned a six-figure salary plus a share of the profits – was nearly as successful. Locke recorded several songs for the soundtracks of these films and was whispered to be shopping for a record deal at the time. On the coattails of the franchise's success, she performed live in concert (one-off gigs) with The Everly Brothers, Eddie Rabbitt and Tom Jones.

During this period, Eastwood did a few movies that had no prominent female character for Locke to play. In the meantime, she accepted some television offers, co-starring with an all-female ensemble cast in Friendships, Secrets and Lies (1979) and portraying big band era vocalist Rosemary Clooney in Rosie: The Rosemary Clooney Story (1982). While the biopic followed Clooney from ages 17 to 40, Locke was 38 when she played the role, and though hardly counting as a proper exception due to its nonlinear structure, this marked the only time she played a mother onscreen.

Locke starred as a bitter heiress who joins a traveling Wild West show in Bronco Billy (1980), her only film with Eastwood not to reach blockbuster status, though it still ranked among the annual box office top 25. The New York Times critic Janet Maslin noticed that "each of them works more delicately here than they have together previously." Locke cited Bronco Billy and The Outlaw Josey Wales as her favorites of the movies they made. The couple's final collaboration as performers was Sudden Impact (1983), the highest-grossing film in the Dirty Harry franchise, in which Locke played an artist with her own code of vigilante justice. Her fee was a reported $350,000.

Locke never appeared in a wide release after Sudden Impact. The film premiered five months before her 40th birthday. Locke announced plans to develop and star in a movie about Marie Antoinette, but the project fell apart. Eastwood then directed Locke in a 1985 Amazing Stories episode entitled "Vanessa in the Garden".

Directing

In 1986, Locke made her feature directorial debut with Ratboy, a parable about a youth who is part rat and part human, produced by Eastwood's company Malpaso.  When asked why she'd been absent from her longtime beau's recent star vehicles, Locke replied simply, "I wasn't right for the roles." Ratboy had limited distribution in the United States, where it was a critical and financial flop, but was well received in Europe, with French newspaper Le Parisien calling it the highlight of the Deauville Film Festival.

Locke's second foray behind the camera was Impulse (1990), starring Theresa Russell as a police officer on the vice squad who goes undercover as a prostitute. Siskel & Ebert gave the film "two thumbs up". In a subsequent interview with Siskel, Locke said she wasn't eager to act again. "If you love the craft of filmmaking as much as I do, it's hard to go back to acting after you've tasted the high of directing."

After a long interruption in her career due to legal difficulties and health issues, Locke directed the made-for-television film Death in Small Doses (1995), based on a true story, and the independent feature Trading Favors (1997), starring Rosanna Arquette.

Memoir and final projects

In 1997, Locke's autobiography The Good, the Bad, and the Very Ugly: A Hollywood Journey was published by William Morrow and Company. In it she called Eastwood "a completely evil, manipulating, lying excuse for a man." Eastwood's lawyers sent a warning letter to the publisher, and although no slander charges arose, Entertainment Tonight canceled a scheduled interview with Locke. She was also bumped from The Oprah Winfrey Show and, in her words, "shut out of most venues to promote the book, in particular the networks." The book received a supportive rave review from New York Daily News writer Liz Smith, while Entertainment Weeklys Dana Kennedy dismissed the book as a "peculiar, not terribly consequential, life story."

Locke told a Spanish website that she'd been informed Entertainment Weekly originally planned to publish a positive review, but for reasons unclear, it was pulled and a negative review appeared instead. The Advocate, a monthly LGBT-interest magazine, was set to do a big article on Locke's book; suddenly and uncharacteristically, Eastwood gave The Advocate an interview, and they decided not to run the piece. She reflected in 2012: "Clint has said so many bad things about me to the media since we split up, and he has so much more access and power to do that. He's said things that were hurtful to my character and hurtful to me professionally." Locke was nonetheless grateful to have a platform at all, stating: "It was a miracle that a major publisher took it."

After 13 years away from acting, Locke returned to the screen in 1999 with cameo roles in the straight-to-video films The Prophet's Game with Dennis Hopper and Clean and Narrow with Wings Hauser. In 2014, it was announced that Locke would serve as an executive producer on the Eli Roth film Knock Knock, starring Keanu Reeves. She came out of retirement once more in 2016, shooting Alan Rudolph's indie Ray Meets Helen with Keith Carradine. The film was screened at Laemmle Music Hall on May 6, 2018, less than six months before Locke died.

Philanthropy

During her tenure at WSM, Locke participated in the annual United Cerebral Palsy (UCP) telethons. One year, she toured Birmingham with folk singer Richard Law.

In 1992, Locke served as honorary chairwoman for the "Starry, Starry Night" silent auction in Costa Mesa, California to benefit Human Options, a shelter for victims of domestic violence. "Being a woman I have great empathy for these women. I can understand how stranded they must feel, how hard it is to change one's life," Locke said.

Personal life

Marriage

On September 25, 1967, Locke married sculptor Gordon Leigh Anderson (born August 2, 1944, Batesville, Arkansas) at the First Presbyterian Church in Nashville, one week after The Heart Is a Lonely Hunter commenced principal photography. Dr. Walter Rowe Courtenay presided over the ceremony. They remained married for 51 years until her death in 2018.

Locke had known Anderson since at least the late 1950s; accounts as to when they met vary by as much as four years. In early 1969, as Locke was flooded with script offers after her Oscar nomination, she and Anderson left Tennessee and moved into a condo at The Andalusia in West Hollywood.

According to a 1989 affidavit, the marriage was "tantamount to sister and brother" and they never consummated it. Anderson was gay.A Fond Farewell to Sondra Locke (1944 – 2018) Harrison, John (December 16, 2018). Filmink. Locke, testifying under oath to a jury, characterized her husband as being "more like a sister to me" and explained, "it's funny the sort of cultural changes, but in those days males and females never lived together unless they were married." According to her death certificate, the two were residing at the same address when she died, and he was the person who reported her death.

Anderson is a central presence in Locke's autobiography, but she doesn't elaborate on her reasons for marrying him beyond the following passage:

Relationships

Given that Locke waited decades to confirm that her marriage was platonic, most of her actual romantic attachments went unpublicized. In the mid-1960s, she dated her supervisor at WSM-TV's PR department, Brad Crandall (1920–1973).  She started as secretary to Tom Griscom in local sales for WSM Radio. According to co-worker Alan Nelson, who died eight months after Locke, he and other staff members believed her promotion resulted from nepotism.

George Crook, a cameraman for WSM, squired Locke to Nashville society events including the 1965 hunt ball. He later got into local politics and was elected mayor of Belle Meade in 2000. Another early boyfriend, personal injury attorney Gary Gober, starred with Locke in Circle Players' productions while attending Vanderbilt University Law School. Locke also dated a sculptor (she did not name him) prior to marrying Anderson.

During her marriage, Locke was rumored to have been linked amorously to co-stars Robert Fields (Cover Me Babe), Bruce Davison (Willard), Paul Sand (The Second Coming of Suzanne) and Bo Hopkins (Gondola), as well as producer Hawk Koch, real estate agent Herb Goldfarb, and John F. Kennedy's nephew Robert Shriver.Walter Scott's Personality Parade. October 15, 1989."Locke, Sondra, 1944-2018". SNAC. For a while in the early 1970s, she shared a liaison with married actor David Soul after they played siblings in an episode of Cannon.

Locke referred to these intervals as "casually exploring for a romantic relationship," noting that she had not fallen in love with any of the men. "Love ... was not something to search out actively; it finds you, I believed."

Life with Eastwood

Locke and actor/director Clint Eastwood entered a domestic partnership in October 1975. She first met Eastwood in 1972 when she unsuccessfully lobbied for the title role in his film Breezy (1973); they became involved upon arrival at the shooting location of The Outlaw Josey Wales (1976) in Page, Arizona. "It was just an immediate attraction between the two of us," Locke recalled in a 2012 documentary. She had simultaneously been wooed by screenwriter Philip Kaufman but chose Eastwood over him. After wrapping the film in December 1975, the couple shuttled between Eastwood's houses in Sherman Oaks and Carmel, as well as rented homes in San Francisco and Tiburon. They eventually settled at 846 Stradella Road in Bel-Air, which Eastwood still owned at the time of Locke's death.

Eastwood was married during the early years of their relationship,"Eastwood won't wed girlfriend". The San Bernardino County Sun, September 8, 1979 before their affair became public in 1978, but his marriage was a nominal one just as Locke's was: he had sired at least two publicly unacknowledged children outside the marriage Page Six December 27, 2018. and confided he'd "never been in love before." Locke claimed Eastwood even sang "She Made Me Monogamous" to her. Eastwood's wife Maggie Johnson lived on a colossal estate in Pebble Beach, where Eastwood rarely stayed, and he and Johnson were understood to have had an open marriage from the start. "I never knew I could love somebody so much, and feel so peaceful about it at the same time," Locke said he told her. Conversely, the media's running narrative was that Eastwood "left" or "walked out on" his wife for Locke as opposed to simply giving up the facade. Locke resented having her relationship with Eastwood labeled as an affair and being made to feel sordid as if she had "stolen" a married man, but did not contemporaneously refute such notions.

Late in the 1970s, Locke became pregnant by Eastwood twice; she terminated both pregnancies. "I'd feel sorry for any child that had me for a mother," she previously told columnist Dick Kleiner in 1969. In 1979, at the age of 35, Locke underwent a tubal ligation at UCLA Medical Center, citing Eastwood's adamancy that parenthood would not fit into their lifestyle. When this became public knowledge a decade after the fact, Eastwood issued a statement:

Locke professed mixed feelings on the matter, stating in one chapter of her autobiography that she was grateful she hadn't had Eastwood's children, while writing in another, "I couldn't help but think that that baby, with both Clint's and my best qualities, would be extraordinary." Eastwood claimed Locke told him on multiple occasions that she never wanted to have children.

Eastwood and Locke were still cohabiting when, in the latter half of the 1980s, he secretly fathered another woman's two children – a fact that did not come to light for almost 20 years. Despite her affirmed ignorance, Locke sensed growing tension in the relationship around 1985, recollecting that "although I definitely still loved Clint, I didn't very much like him." In retrospect, she gathered "either he changed from white to black, or I had been living with somebody I didn't even know."

Palimony suit
According to court testimony, Locke confronted Eastwood over his passive-aggressive behavior on December 29, 1988, eliciting estrangement between the couple. Locke testified that after she and Eastwood made their final joint appearance on January 6 at the American Cinema Awards, they spent exactly two nights together, without intimate contact. Eastwood then effectively vacated their Bel-Air mansion, sleeping in the adjacent caretakers' quarters or at his apartment in Burbank. Locke thought Eastwood was acting out "because he wasn't number one at the box office anymore, or because he was facing his mortality" (Eastwood was 58 at the time). As far as she was concerned their relationship was still salvageable. At any rate, she called divorce lawyer Norman Oberstein to explore her options should the separation be permanent. Unbeknownst to Locke, Eastwood eavesdropped on those consultations by means of a wiretap that he placed on their home phone in early March.

On the morning of April 3 or 4, Eastwood complained in the kitchen that Locke was "sitting on [his] only real estate in Los Angeles" and bolted. Locke later defensively declared: "Clint is not good at direct communication. He really is a man of few words. You might just as well have a direct confrontation with a wall." On April 10, 1989, Malpaso employees changed the locks on the family residence, moved Locke's possessions into storage, and posted security guards at the front gate per Eastwood's order. Locke was shooting Impulse (1990) at the time of the lockout. She filed a $70 million palimony suit on April 26, charging Eastwood with breach of contract, emotional distress, forcible entry and possession of stolen goods. Forced abortions and compulsory sterilization were also cited, though Locke would later recategorize those operations as a "mutual decision".

During their 14 years as de facto husband and wife, Locke and Eastwood had lived in seven homes and acquired four, including a retreat in Sun Valley, Idaho, and the Rising River Ranch near Cassel.102 Wedeln Ln, Sun Valley, ID 83353 Zillow Locke sought half of Eastwood's earnings and an equal division of property, requesting title to the house in Bel-Air and to the Gothic-style West Hollywood place Eastwood had leased to Gordon Anderson since 1982. She also asked Judge Dana Senit Henry to bar Eastwood from the Bel-Air house "because I know him to have a terrible temper ... and he has frequently been abusive to me."

Locke battled Eastwood in court for 19 months; she developed breast cancer during proceedings and said the treatments sapped her will to fight. In November 1990, the parties reached a private settlement wherein Eastwood set up a $1.5 million multiyear film development/directing pact for Locke at Warner Bros. in exchange for dropping the suit. She was awarded the West Hollywood property (valued at $2.2 million), $450,000 cash and unspecified monthly support payments as well.

The breakup affected Locke's social life. Her closest friends had been the wives of Eastwood's colleagues: Maria Shriver, Cynthia Sikes Yorkin and Lili Fini Zanuck, all 10–11 years younger than Locke and married to film industry heavyweights Arnold Schwarzenegger, Bud Yorkin and Richard D. Zanuck respectively. Locke's friendships with those women gradually faded as their husbands ghosted her. The female comrades Locke credited with loyalty and support were those she had known pre-Eastwood: art director Elayne Barbara Ceder, whom she met on The Second Coming of Suzanne, and realtor Denise Fraker, wife of A Reflection of Fear director William A. Fraker.

Fraud suit
Between 1990 and 1993, Warner Bros. rejected more than 30 scripts that Locke pitched to the studio – including those for Junior (1994) and Addicted to Love (1997) – and refused to let her direct any of their in-house projects.The Triumph and Tragedy of Sondra Locke Yohana Desta, Vanity Fair, December 14, 2018 When her contract had yielded zero directing assignments three years in, Locke became convinced the deal was a sham. She began to seek corroboration and came across incriminating printouts from WB's bookkeeping records. Locke contended that the money WB pretended they were paying her came from Eastwood's pocket and was laundered through the operating budget of Unforgiven (1992). In June 1995 she sued him again, for fraud and breach of fiduciary duty."Locke Says She Was 'Humiliated'". Los Angeles Times, September 13, 1996 According to Locke's attorney Peggy Garrity, Eastwood committed "the ultimate betrayal" by arranging the "bogus" deal as a way to keep her out of work. Garrity added that Eastwood had held out the allegedly counterfeit deal "like a dangled carrot" to persuade Locke to drop the earlier palimony suit. Locke said that she "was stunned and outraged at the way I had been tricked and cheated a second time."

The case went to trial in September 1996. One juror disclosed that the panel sided with Locke by a 10-to-2 vote (nine votes are needed for a verdict) and were only debating the amount. Before any court decision could be made, Locke settled the case with Eastwood for an undisclosed amount of money. The outcome, Locke said, sent a "loud and clear" message to Hollywood, "that people cannot get away with whatever they want to just because they're powerful." According to Locke, "in this business, people get so accustomed to being abused, they just accept the abuse and say, 'Well, that's just the way it is.' Well, it isn't."

For his part, Eastwood waved the lawsuit off as a "dime-novel plot," continuing, "it's all about money ... about getting something for nothing." He accused Locke of using her cancer to gain the jury's sympathy: "She plays the victim very well. Unfortunately she had cancer and so she plays that card."

Locke brought a separate action against Warner Bros. for allegedly conspiring with Eastwood to sabotage her directorial career. As had happened with the previous lawsuit, this ended in an out-of-court settlement, in May 1999. By then, Locke had fired Garrity and hired Neil Papiano to represent her. The agreement with Warner Bros., Locke said, was "a happy ending." "I feel elated. This has been the best day in a long, long time," she told reporters on court house steps. The case is used in some modern law-school contract textbooks to illustrate the legal concept of good faith.

Illness; last relationship

A lifelong nonsmoker (save for a few film roles), Locke practiced Transcendental Meditation and worked out with weights, though she hated running. In September 1990, she confirmed reports that she had breast cancer. "Due to factors in my personal life, I have sustained two years of extreme and unnecessary stress, which my doctors tell me has been my enemy," Locke said at the time. She added that Eastwood never communicated with her after her diagnosis: "He doesn't care if I live or die."Sondra Locke Clipping Magazine photo orig 1pg 8x10 M7797 at Amazon's Entertainment Collectibles Store

Locke underwent a double mastectomy at Cedars-Sinai Medical Center, followed by chemotherapy. During treatment, she began dating Scott Cunneen (born September 10, 1961, Long Beach, California), an intern assigned to perform the post-surgical checkup. Unfazed by their 17-year age difference – and that Locke was only three years younger than his mother – they soon went public with the romance, dining at paparazzi hotspot Spago on one of their early dates in November 1990. Cunneen moved in with her in the spring of 1991. She called it a "real, supportive, and equal relationship."

In February 2001, Locke purchased a six-bedroom gated mansion in the Hollywood Hills, where she resided for the remainder of her life. Built in 1925, the home's interior was redesigned to look like Locke's old house on Stradella Road. She and Cunneen eventually broke up, albeit without publicity, since she had faded from public view.

In 2015, after a 25-year period of apparent remission, Locke's cancer returned and metastasized to her bones.

Death

Locke died at age 74 on November 3, 2018, at her Los Angeles home from cardiac arrest related to breast and bone cancer.Sondra Locke, Oscar-nominated actress, has died  Sandra Gonzalez, CNN, December 14, 2018 Her remains were cremated on November 9 at Pierce Brothers Westwood Village Memorial Park and Mortuary and the ashes were given to her widower, Gordon Anderson. Locke bequeathed Anderson an estimated fortune of $20 million, and seemed to have always supported him financially.

Media blackout
Locke's death was kept secret until December 13, when Radar Online broke the news the day before Eastwood's latest blockbuster The Mule (2018) opened in theaters nationwide, citing the Los Angeles County Department of Public Health. The Associated Press said "it is not clear why it took nearly six weeks to come to light." Anderson, according to the scant AP report, was unreachable, and a representative for Locke ignored People'''s request for comment. So hidden had basic facts been kept, that The New York Times oxymoronically noted 41 days after she died: "A list of survivors was not immediately [sic] available."

Locke's death received no television coverage except for a 15-second spot on ABC World News Tonight. Eastwood did not comment on the death, nor did any of Locke's other living exes, nor any of her friends or relatives. Co-stars such as Richard Dreyfuss, Cicely Tyson, Louie Anderson, Sally Kellerman, Stacy Keach and Ted Neeley – all active on social media – were equally silent. On the 91st Academy Awards telecast, broadcast nearly four months after Locke died, she was omitted from the In Memoriam segment. In absence of any explanation, many surmised that Locke had to have requested the blackout in her final wishes, perhaps to keep her true age from being exposed.

Legacy

Locke is remembered as an early pioneer for women in Hollywood. She was one of 11 female filmmakers in 1990, the year WB released her sophomore feature, Impulse. By the time of Trading Favors (1997), her fourth effort, still only eight percent of all films were made by women, per the Directors Guild of America.

Locke's influence as a feminist icon was duly acknowledged by the mainstream press. In 1989, Claudia Puig of the Los Angeles Times described her lawsuit against Clint Eastwood as a "precedent-setting legal case, as it raises the question of whether a woman, who is legally married to one man, can claim palimony rights from another." Childfree by choice – unusual for a person of her generation – Locke was among the first celebrities to publicly discuss her abortion experiences. The avowal made Locke "a talking-point in America's sexual politics debate," according to The Guardians Peter Bradshaw. Locke's subsequent relationship with a doctor young enough to be her son added to her notoriety.

Cinematographer David Worth credits Locke with his big break. She is admired by such actresses as Frances Fisher and Rosanna Arquette, who applauded the strength of her directorial accomplishments, however short-lived.

During the last third of her life, Locke maintained she was blacklisted from the film industry as a result of her acrimonious split from Eastwood; his career went forward unscathed. Peggy Garrity, Locke's former counsel, recalled the courtroom drama in her book In the Game: The Highs and Lows of a Trailblazing Trial Lawyer (2016). Garrity revealed that Locke's 1999 confidential settlement from WB "was for many millions more than the settlement with Clint had been." Locke v. Warner Bros. Inc also catalyzed changes within the legal system. In a landmark decision, California's Supreme Court ruled that access to civil trials could no longer be closed off to the public. Los Angeles Times, May 7, 1999.

Numerous outlets faced pushback over their chosen headlines for Locke's obituary. Several major publications prefaced news of her death by tagging Eastwood's name atop the article, which received criticism by some who deemed it a sexist epitaph, with fans online pointing out that Locke was an Oscar nominee prior to meeting Eastwood. Women's blog Jezebel criticized The Hollywood Reporter for ostensibly regarding Locke as a nonentity; THR subsequently changed its headline. News organization TheWrap – whose editor, Sharon Waxman, reviewed Locke's memoir for The Washington Post in 1997 – opined that her story "should stir resonance in this age of the #MeToo movement." In a tribute to the late actress, author Sarah Weinman wrote: "Sondra Locke, like Barbara Loden, deserves to be known for her work, not for the famous man she was disastrously involved with."

Among those voicing an unfavorable opinion of Locke was film critic Rex Reed, who had interviewed her for a 1967 profile in The New York Times. "[She] lied so much during her brief but colorful career that when she lost her battle with cancer at age 74, I wondered if it was a publicity stunt," Reed wrote in an essay for Observer.

Our Very Own
In 1971, fifth-graders at Eastside Elementary in Locke's hometown of Shelbyville, Tennessee, were left star-struck when Locke made a visit and held pretend "auditions" in the class to show them what it was like in Hollywood. One student, Cameron Watson, was inspired by Locke and is now an actor/director. Watson's period drama Our Very Own (2005) takes place in Shelbyville in 1978 and concerns a group of teenagers who want to meet Locke when she returns to town for the local premiere of Every Which Way but Loose''. Watson decided to do the movie after performing a standup routine about Locke and about how people in Shelbyville were obsessed with her. Locke attended one of those performances in 2004 at the Tiffany Theater in West Hollywood. "The minute she heard the first reference to her or to her family, she threw up her arms: 'What the hell is this?'" Watson said. "By the end of the reading, she was doubled over." Locke gave the script her blessing and accepted an invitation to be special guest at the film's premiere. The movie was a "special gift" to Locke, according to Deborah Obenchain, another Eastside student who said she did not think Locke really understood her impact on the small town she once called home. "I think it meant just as much to her. … In our own way … we got to live out a little bit of our dreams by making the movie and meeting her."

Filmography

As actress

As director

Stage

Footnotes

See also

List of American film actresses
List of female film and television directors
List of Middle Tennessee State University people
List of people from Los Angeles
List of people from Tennessee

References

External links

 Sondra Locke at the British Film Institute
 
 

1944 births
2018 deaths
Actresses from Los Angeles
Actresses from Tennessee
American autobiographers
American film actresses
American women film directors
American women film producers
American feminists
Deaths from bone cancer
Deaths from breast cancer
Deaths from cancer in California
Film directors from Los Angeles
Film directors from Tennessee
Middle Tennessee State University alumni
Age controversies
People from Shelbyville, Tennessee
Women autobiographers
Writers from Los Angeles
Writers from Tennessee
20th-century American actresses
20th-century American biographers
American women biographers
20th-century American women writers
21st-century American actresses
American television actresses
American stage actresses
American people of Scottish descent
American women memoirists
20th-century American memoirists
Childfree
American television directors
Feminist filmmakers
Film producers from Tennessee
American feminist writers
California Independents
American film producers
Eastwood family
Actresses from Nashville, Tennessee
People from Gallatin, Tennessee
People from Wartrace, Tennessee
People from Nashville, Tennessee
Warner Bros. contract players
20th Century Studios contract players
People from Carmel-by-the-Sea, California
People from Sun Valley, Idaho